Homeobox protein DLX-3 is a protein that in humans is encoded by the DLX3 gene.

Function 

Dlx3 is a crucial regulator of hair follicle differentiation and cycling. Dlx3 transcription is mediated through Wnt, and colocalization of Dlx3 with phospho-SMAD1/5/8 is involved in the regulation of transcription by BMP signaling. Dlx3 transcription is also induced by BMP-2 through transactivation with SMAD1 and SMAD4.

Many vertebrate homeo box-containing genes have been identified on the basis of their sequence similarity with Drosophila developmental genes. Members of the Dlx gene family contain a homeobox that is related to that of Distal-less (Dll), a gene expressed in the head and limbs of the developing fruit fly. The Distal-less (Dlx) family of genes comprises at least 6 different members, DLX1-DLX6. This gene is located in a tail-to-tail configuration with another member of the gene family on the long arm of chromosome 17.

Clinical significance 

Mutations in this gene have been associated with the autosomal dominant conditions trichodentoosseous syndrome (TDO) and amelogenesis imperfecta with taurodontism.

References

Further reading

External links 
 
 

Transcription factors